Nusyn "Ned" Glass (April 1, 1906 – June 15, 1984) was a Polish-born American  character actor who appeared in more than eighty films and on television more than one hundred times, frequently playing nervous, cowardly, or deceitful characters. Short and bald, with a slight hunch to his shoulders, he was immediately recognizable by his distinct appearance, his nasal voice, and his pronounced New York City accent.

Notable roles he portrayed included Doc in West Side Story (1961) and Gideon in Charade (1963).

Early life
Glass was born in Radom, Congress Poland, Russian Empire, to a Jewish family. He emigrated to the United States at an early age and grew up in New York City.  He attended City College.

Career
Glass worked in vaudeville, and appeared on Broadway in 1931 in the Elmer Rice play Counsellor-at-Law. He continued to act and direct on Broadway until 1936, when he was signed as a Metro-Goldwyn-Mayer contract player. He made his first film appearance in 1937, with an uncredited role in True Confession, and his first credited film appearance came in two episodes of the serial Dick Tracy Returns (1938).

Beginning in 1937, Glass worked regularly in films, helped by friends like producer John Houseman. He was a frequent member of Columbia Pictures' short subjects dept. roster, and a favorite of directors Jules White and Del Lord.  White prominently featured Glass in The Three Stooges' Nutty But Nice and costarred him with Buster Keaton in Mooching Through Georgia.  A Toluca Lake neighbor friend of Moe Howard of The Three Stooges, that real-life factoid inspired an untrue myth that Moe arranged for Ned to have parts the Stooges' films; actually, Moe had minimal-to-zero input into casting. He also appeared in From Nurse to Worse, Three Little Sew and Sews, You Nazty Spy! and I'll Never Heil Again Glass did not appear in any films released between 1942 and 1947, possibly because of military service, but he generally worked in a handful of films almost every year thereafter, playing small roles and bit parts, including additional Three Stooges films Hokus Pokus, Three Hams on Rye and Flagpole Jitters. He was reportedly briefly blacklisted, during which time he found work as a carpenter. 
Glass appeared uncredited in the 1952 film The Bad and the Beautiful as the costumer for "The Doom of the Cat Men," a purportedly B-picture for Harry Pebbel. 
Glass began showing up on television in 1952, when he was cast on an episode of The Red Skelton Show. He later was frequently seen on CBS in Jackie Gleason's The Honeymooners sketches.  He was in an early episode (2.28) of Gunsmoke, "The Photographer", as “Old Grubby”, a scruffy little prospector who's brutally murdered and scalped to obtain a cheaply thrilling photograph of Western violence. He was in 8 other episodes as well, at times in a recurring role playing a Townsman named “Husk”.  From 1955 to 1958, Glass played "Sgt. Andy Pendleton" on You'll Never Get Rich (better remembered as The Phil Silvers Show). In 1957, he appeared as "Jackson", an arms dealer to Indians, in an episode of the syndicated western series, Boots and Saddles, as well as a railroad ticket agent in Alfred Hitchcock's North by Northwest. He  appeared in the syndicated crime drama, Sheriff of Cochise, starring John Bromfield and in the ABC western series, The Rebel, starring Nick Adams. He appeared too in David Janssen's crime drama, Richard Diamond, Private Detective.
(TV Series Peter Gunn)
As a reformed safecracker. Mr.Sylvester
Glass guest starred in three sitcoms in the early years of television, NBC's The People's Choice, starring Jackie Cooper, CBS's Angel, with Annie Fargé, and ABC's Guestward, Ho!, starring Joanne Dru. He portrayed Doc, the drugstore owner, in the Hollywood version of West Side Story. In the fall of 1963, Glass guest starred in an episode of the 13-week CBS combination sitcom/drama, Glynis, starring British actress Glynis Johns as a mystery writer, with Keith Andes as her attorney-husband. In 1964 he guest-starred in an episode of the sitcom The Cara Williams Show, in 1965 he appeared in an episode of the comedy-drama Kentucky Jones, and in 1966 he appeared in two episodes of The Fugitive, working with David Janssen once more.

Glass popped up in the 1967 episode of The Monkees titled "Monkees in the Ring" as fight promoter Joey Sholto, and as convicted forger "Freddie the Forger" in a  fifth-season episode of NBC's Get Smart titled "Do I Hear a Vaults?" (1970). He played "Sol Cooper" on the Diahann Carroll vehicle Julia from 1968 to 1971, and was nominated in 1969 for an Emmy Award for his performance in the "A Little Chicken Soup Never Hurt Anybody" episode. Glass also played "Uncle Moe Plotnick" on the short-lived series Bridget Loves Bernie (1972–1973).  In 1981 he appeared on Barney Miller, as Stanley Golden, in the episode "Field Associate" and also in 1975, in the episode, "You Dirty Rat", as Mr. Sam Becker, the exterminator, from Becker & Sons.

Highlights of Glass's film career include playing "Doc" in West Side Story (1961), "Popcorn" in Blake Edwards's thriller Experiment in Terror (1962), and bad guy "Leopold W. Gideon" in Stanley Donen's Charade (1963). His other film appearances included the Elvis Presley film Kid Galahad (1962), Who's Got the Action? (1962), Papa's Delicate Condition (1963), Blindfold (1965), A Big Hand for the Little Lady (1966), The Fortune Cookie (1966), Blackbeard's Ghost (1968), Never a Dull Moment (1968), The Love Bug (1969), Lady Sings the Blues (1972), Save the Tiger (1973), The All-American Boy (1973), and the TV movie Goldie and the Boxer (1979). His final film appearance was in the low-budget comedy Street Music (1981), and his final TV appearance was as a pickpocket on Cagney & Lacey in 1982.

Personal life
Glass was married to actress Kitty McHugh, sister of character actor Frank McHugh and bit player Matt McHugh. Kitty committed suicide on 3 September 1954. Glass later married actress Jean (also known as Jhean) Burton, but that marriage ended in divorce.

Death
Glass died in Encino Hospital in Encino, California, on 15 June 1984 at the age of 78, after a long illness.

Filmography

True Confession (1937) - Second Photographer (uncredited)
Give Me a Sailor (1938) - Reporter (uncredited)
Dick Tracy Returns (1938, Serial) - Kid Stark [Chs. 1, 13]
Next Time I Marry (1938) - Reporter (uncredited)
Woman Doctor (1939) - Undetermined Role (uncredited)
I'm from Missouri (1939) - Teller (uncredited)
Coast Guard (1939) - Lookout (uncredited)
Glamour for Sale (1940) - Cop (uncredited)
Prairie Schooners (1940) - Skinny Hutch (uncredited)
Beyond the Sacramento (1940) - Bank Teller George (uncredited)
The Richest Man in Town (1941) - Man (uncredited)
King of Dodge City (1941) - Bank Teller (uncredited)
Go West, Young Lady (1941) - Loiterer (uncredited)
Perfect Strangers (1950) - O'Hanlon (uncredited)
The Damned Don't Cry! (1950) - Taxi Driver (uncredited)
The Great Jewel Robber (1950) - Prisoner in Jail Cell (uncredited)
The Underworld Story (1950) - Editor, Atlas News Service (uncredited)
Mystery Street (1950) - Dr. Ben Levy, McAdoo's asst. (uncredited)
He's a Cockeyed Wonder (1950) - Sam Phillips
Storm Warning (1951) - George Athens
Lightning Strikes Twice (1951) - Tom - a Rancher (uncredited)
The People Against O'Hara (1951) - Preliminary Hearing Judge (uncredited)
Callaway Went Thataway (1951) - Mailman (uncredited)
It's a Big Country (1951) - Newspaper Office Receptionist (uncredited)
Just This Once (1952) - Court Clerk (uncredited)
The Girl in White (1952) - Anatomy Professor (uncredited)
You for Me (1952) - Harlow Douglas (uncredited)
Stop, You're Killing Me (1952) - Sad Sam Callahan (uncredited)
Come Back, Little Sheba (1952) - Man at AA Meeting (uncredited)
The Bad and the Beautiful (1952) - Wardrobe Man (uncredited)
The Clown (1953) - Danny Daylor (uncredited)
The War of the Worlds (1953) - Well-Dressed Looter w/ a suitcase of cash (uncredited)
I Love Melvin (1953) - Theatre Manager (uncredited)
Trouble Along the Way (1953) - Pool-Player (uncredited)
Julius Caesar (1953) - Cobbler (uncredited)
The Caddy (1953) - Stage Manager (uncredited)
Mister Scoutmaster (1953) - News Dealer (uncredited)
Jennifer (1953) - Grocery Clerk
Geraldine (1953) - Agent (uncredited)
The Yellow Tomahawk (1954) - Willy
The Steel Cage (1954) - Pete, the Guard (segment "The Hostages")
Fright (1956) - Taxi Driver
Four Boys and a Gun (1957) - Landlord
Hot Rod Rumble (1957) - Auto Parts Dealer
Back from the Dead (1957) - The Doctor
Black Patch (1957) - Luke the Bar-Keep
The Joker Is Wild (1957) - Johnson (uncredited)
Hear Me Good (1957) - Funk (uncredited)
The Defiant Ones (1958) - Doctor (uncredited)
King Creole (1958) - Hotel Desk Clerk (uncredited)
The Five Pennies (1959) - Murray (uncredited)
The Rebel Set (1959) - Sidney Horner
North by Northwest (1959) - Ticket Seller (uncredited)
The Jayhawkers! (1959) - Storekeeper
The Last Angry Man (1959) - Butcher (uncredited)
West Side Story (1961) - Doc
Experiment in Terror (1962) - Popcorn
Kid Galahad (1962) - Max Lieberman
Who's Got the Action? (1962) - Baldy
Papa's Delicate Condition (1963) - Mr. Sparrow
Charade (1963) - Leopold W. Gideon
 Patty Duke Show (1965) - Lawyer
Blindfold (1966) - Lippy
A Big Hand for the Little Lady (1966) - Owney Price
The Fortune Cookie (1966) - Doc Schindler
Blackbeard's Ghost (1968) - Teller
Never a Dull Moment (1968) - Rinzy Tobreski
Hogan's Heroes (1968, TV Series) - Max
The Love Bug (1969) - Toll Booth Attendant
Lady Sings the Blues (1972) - The Agent
Save the Tiger (1973) - Sid Fivush
The All-American Boy (1973) - Arty Bale
Goldie and the Boxer (1979) - Al Levinsky
Street Music (1981) - Sam

References

External links

 at Great Character Actors
Obituary in The New York Times

1906 births
1984 deaths
City College of New York alumni
Male actors from New York City
Polish male film actors
Polish male stage actors
Polish male television actors
People from Radom
Hollywood blacklist
Metro-Goldwyn-Mayer contract players
People from Greater Los Angeles
20th-century American male actors
Jewish Polish male actors
Jewish American male actors
Polish emigrants to the United States
20th-century American Jews